Peter Charles Lamana (May 15, 1921 – August 7, 2007) was an American football player who played at the linebacker, center, fullback positions. 

A native of Bristol, Connecticut, he attended Cathedral High School in Springfield, Massachusetts. He played college football for Boston University.

During World War II, Lamana served in the U.S. Army's 78th Division. In August 1946, Lamana signed to play professional football for the Chicago Rockets of the All-America Football Conference.<  He played for the Rockets from 1946 to 1948, appearing in 34 or 35 games.

After his football career ended, he worked in human resources for Marshall Field's and Co. He died in 2007 at age 87 at MacNeal Hospital in Berwyn, Illinois.

References

1921 births
2007 deaths
Chicago Rockets players
Boston University Terriers football players
Players of American football from Connecticut
People from Bristol, Connecticut